Paul Faure may refer to:
Paul Faure (archaeologist) (1916–2007), French archaeologist
Paul Faure (politician) (1878–1960), French politician